Vasyl Hryhorovych Krychevsky (January 12, 1873 in Vorozhba village, now Lebedyn Raion – November 15, 1952, in Ukraine,  was a Ukrainian painter, architect, art scholar, graphic artist, film art consultant, pedagogue and master of applied art and decorative art. He is the designer of the 1918 Ukrainian coat of arms, state seals, banknotes. He was the brother of Ukrainian painter Fedir Krychevsky.

Biography 
Vasyl Krychevsky was born in the village of Vorozhba, near Lebedyn, to a family of eight children where he was the eldest. His father Hryhoriy Yakymovych Krychevsky was a county state doctor of Jewish descent who converted to Orthodox Christianity and married a Ukrainian woman, Praskovia Hryhorivna.

Krychevsky had little formal education, but a deep interest in Ukrainian folklore and art history.  During the First World War, he was one of the founders and rectors of the Ukrainian State Academy of Arts.  In the 1920s he taught at the Kiev Institute of Plastic Arts, the Kiev Architectural Institute. Among the students – Joseph Karakis, who studied from Krichevsky "Interior of residential and public buildings" as well as painting techniques. He then taught at the Odessa Art School and served in the architectural department of the Kiev State Art Institute until 1941.

Krychevsky moved to Lviv in 1943 where he was appointed a rector of a new Ukrainian art school, which eventually became the Lviv National Academy of Arts. After the World War II, he lived briefly in Paris before immigrating to South America in 1948. He died in Caracas, the capital of Venezuela on November 15, 1952.

Artistic career
Krychevsky first gained public recognition in 1903 when he won the architectural competition to build the Poltava Zemstvo Building (now the Poltava Regional Studies Museum). His design of the building was based on the traditions of Ukrainian folk architecture.

As a painter, he created a total of about 3000 paintings, drawings, ornamental designs, bookcovers. His work was influenced by French impressionism.

It was at the request of President Mykhailo Hrushevsky that Krychevsky designed the state emblems and seals of the Ukrainian People's Republic as well as the Republic's banknotes.  Krychevsky was a collector and student of Ukrainian folk art, and promoted such handicrafts among common people.

From 1907 to 1910, Krychevsky designed sets and costumes for over 15 plays and operas including Mykhailo Starytsky's Bohdan Khmelnytsky and Bedřich Smetana's The Bartered Bride. From 1917 to 18 he worked with the Ukrainian National Theater.

On several projects Krychevsky worked along with another Ukrainian architect Petro Kostyrko who in 1960 did reconstruction of the former Poltava Governorate Administration building. Some of his works are present abroad, the largest set of works is in the Ukrainian Museum in New York.

Gallery

See also
 Ukrainian Venezuelan

Further reading
 Vadim Sherbakivskiy. Vasyl Krychevsky. London, 1954.
 Vasyl Krychevsky. Jubilee exhibition. Catalogue. New-York, 1973.
 Vadim Pavlovsky. Vasyl H. Krychevsky. Life and Work. New York, 1974.

Notes

References 

1873 births
1952 deaths
People from Sumy Oblast
People from Kharkov Governorate
Ukrainian Impressionist painters
Ukrainian architects
Ukrainian people of Jewish descent
Ukrainian designers
20th-century Ukrainian painters
20th-century Ukrainian male artists
Ukrainian expatriates in Germany
Ukrainian emigrants to Venezuela
Academic staff of the National Academy of Visual Arts and Architecture
Ukrainian male painters
Artists from the Russian Empire